Peumansend Creek is a stream in Caroline County, in the U.S. state of Virginia.

Peumansend Creek (Peuman's End) was named after Peuman, a pirate who was killed there by vigilantes.

See also
List of rivers of Virginia

References

Rivers of Caroline County, Virginia
Rivers of Virginia